Eckersdorf is a municipality in the district of Bayreuth in Bavaria in Germany.

Geography 
The municipality of Eckersdorf is located on the northern edge of an area called "Little Switzerland" (German: Fränkische Schweiz), close to the world-famous festival town of Bayreuth. The highest elevation in the region of Eckersdorf is the Sophienberg with an altitude of 593 m.

Districts
The present-day municipality of Eckersdorf was created in the course of municipal reform in 1978.

According to the information given by the local government, there are 22 official districts.

Neighboring communities 
The neighboring communities of Eckersdorf are (starting north in clockwise order):
Thurnau, Bayreuth, Mistelbach, and Mistelgau.

History 
Eckersdorf was first mentioned in 1149 in the so-called Giechburgvertrag. The Counts of Andechs-Meranien (Grafen von Andechs-Meranien) owned the current area of Eckersdorf until they died off in 1248. The lords of Berg Plassenberg (Herren von Plassenberg) acquired first property in the Eckersdorf area in 1420. A hundred years later, the lords were in full possession of Eckersdorf. After the last representative of the family died in 1552, Eckersdorf came to the Lords of Lüchau, and then it fell to the Markgrafschaft Bayreuth in 1757. As part of the Prussian Principality of Bayreuth, Eckersdorf became a French possession through the Treaties of Tilsit, until 1810, when it became part of Bavaria. In the course of administrative reform in Bavaria in 1818, today's municipality Eckersdorf was created.

Politics 
At the latest elections for mayor in 2020, Sybille Pichl (Freie Wählergemeinschaft Eckersdorf-Donndorf und Umgebung) was re-elected. She has been in office since 2010.

Sights 

Johann Jacob Spindler built Schloss Fantaisie for Margravine Elisabeth Fredericka Sophie of Brandenburg-Bayreuth from 1758 to 1765. Today, there is a garden museum in this rococo palace.

References 
 

Bayreuth (district)